Netanya Academic College (HaAkademit Netanya) is a private college based in Netanya, Israel. Established in 1994 by a team from Bar-Ilan University, it has an enrolment of around 4,000 undergraduate students. It was founded by Zvi Arad, who served as its president for 24 years.

History
The college was established in 1994 by Zvi Arad at the request of the mayors of Netanya, Yoel Elroi and Zvi Poleg. A partner in the initiation and establishment of the college was Miriam Feirberg, who at that time served as head of the Education Department of Netanya. Today the college is an accredited institute of higher education that grant first and second academic degrees in a variety of fields.

The college offers Bachelor's and Master's degrees in several subjects, focusing on law, business administration, finance and computer science.

Notable faculty
 Ernest Krausz (1931-2018), Israeli professor of sociology and President at Bar Ilan University

Notable alumni 

 Anat Guetta (born 1967), chair of the Israel Securities Authority (ISA)

See also

List of universities and colleges in Israel
Education in Israel

References

Colleges in Israel
Universities and colleges in Netanya
Law schools in Israel